Daniel Morales may refer to:

 Daniel Morales (swimmer) (born 1977), Spanish former swimmer
 Daniel Morales (footballer, born 1975), former Brazilian footballer
 Daniel Morales (Chilean footballer) (1928-2007), Chilean footballer
 Daniel Morales, birth name of Venezuelan singer and producer Danny Ocean
 Dan Morales (born 1956), American politician from Texas